Public transport in Sabadell (Catalonia, Spain) is provided by several services and companies. The city of Sabadell is one of the biggest in Catalonia, and located in the densely urbanised comarca of Vallès Occidental, making up a conurbation with localities such as Terrassa or Rubí. It is also part of the broader Metropolitan Area of Barcelona, and located on fare zone 2 of the city's transportation authority Autoritat del Transport Metropolità (ATM).

Ferrocarrils de la Generalitat de Catalunya and Sabadell Metro
FGC operates the network known as Metro del Vallès, which serves most towns in the region and which is undergoing important growth. The municipality of Sabadell, a terminus of one of the network's lines, will in its turn include a few new stations, making up the so-called Sabadell Metro.

Renfe

Bus lines
Bus services in Sabadell are operated by Transports Urbans de Sabadell (TUS). The network consists of 13 lines.

Airport
The Sabadell Airport was opened in 1934.

See also
Transport in Barcelona
Transport in Terrassa
Metro del Vallès

References